Mammillaria rhodantha, the rainbow pincushion, is a plant in the cactus family (Cactaceae) and is one of 171 species in the genus Mammillaria which are characterized by having nipple-shaped tubercles or prominences on their surface.

Description 
The cactus usually grows in small clumps or can be solitary. The stem is a short glabrous column that is covered with spikes. The entire plant body is covered with tubercles. The tubercles are conical in nature. It is from these tubercles that the spines arise. Usually there are 15 to 18 spines  in length coming from each tubercle. It has spikes that grow from the entire body. The bottom half of the cactus has spines that are white or gray and appear to be dying. The flowers are a deep-pink to a purple color. The species flowers for very long periods of time. It starts blooming in the spring and continues to bloom until autumn. An orange-brown seed is produced. Also there is a white wool that can be seen growing on the top part of the plant body.

Anything lower than this will kill it.

Synonyms 
 Mammillaria droegeana
 Mammillaria fuscata
 Mammillaria rhodantha var. droegeana
 Mammillaria calacantha
 Mammillaria pringlei
 Mammillaria bonavitii
 Cactus rhodanthus
 Neomammillaria rhodantha

Gardening 
It is commonly used as a houseplant.  It does not need much care throughout the year.  It is small in size and usually only requires a small pot.  Since it is a desert plant it does not have to be watered often.  It does not require any special treatment other than plentiful light to encourage spine formation.  It also has flowers for much of the year, making it very visually appealing.

Under the synonym Mammillaria pringlei (lemon ball), M. rhodantha subsp. pringlei is a recipient of the Royal Horticultural Society's Award of Garden Merit.

References

External links 
 http://www.cactiguide.com is the main source for the species list, and in turn sourced from several books which are listed on that site.
 http://www.mammillarias.net is the main up-to-date internet resource, with complete species and varieties description, distribution maps and a large selection of photographs of all Mammillaria species both in nature and cultivated. 
 http://SucculentCity.googlepages.com Mammillaria Page: Cultivation Data and Photographs

rhodantha
Cacti of Mexico
Garden plants of North America